The Hermosa Group is a group of geologic formations in Utah and Colorado. It preserves fossils dating back to the Carboniferous period.

See also

 List of fossiliferous stratigraphic units in Utah
 Paleontology in Utah

References
 

Carboniferous geology of Utah